The bilateral foreign relations between the Republic of the Philippines and Republic of China (Taiwan) are a subject of China–Philippines relations. Among other issues between the two are the South China Sea dispute and the political status of Taiwan.

Since 1975, The Philippines recognized the People's Republic of China as the sole legitimate authority of "China", but maintains unofficial relations with Taiwan through the Manila Economic and Cultural Office in Taipei and Taipei Economic and Cultural Office in Manila.

History

The Changbin culture (長濱文化) in Taiwan, dated to be around 10,000 years old, is believed to have originated from either the Philippines or southeast China, according to recent analysis. The archaeological discovery yielded a grave site and 40,000 tools and tool fragments made of stone, shell and bone. It is believed that the people responsible for the site are of Negrito ancestry, whose ethnic groups are still scattered in the Philippines and other areas in Southeast Asia.

Later, Austronesian peoples who came to Taiwan migrated southward to the Philippines. In some case, a back-migration to Taiwan also occurred, further diversifying the genetic relationship and flow of peoples between Taiwan and the Philippines. Aboriginal peoples in Taiwan and many ethnic groups in the Philippines made intensive trade networks, of which a prime focus in the jade maritime road, which played a major role in trade relations for at least 2,500 years between 4,000 years ago until the Iron Age began roughly 500 years into the Common Era. Raw jade was mined in Taiwan and was processed extensively in the Philippines, then traded throughout east and southeast Asia. This jade trade route, which began between Taiwan and the Philippines, also branched towards Borneo, Vietnam, Cambodia, and peninsular Thailand, becoming “one of the most extensive sea-based trade networks of a single geological material in the prehistoric world.” The Philippines also produced and exported wrought iron into Taiwan in 400AD.

By the 10th century, a new trade route was established between the Philippines, southern Taiwan, the Penghu islands, and Quanzhou in China. The 12th century saw the rise of the Pisheye (Visaya), who raided the southern coasts of China, and were believed to have rested at the Straight in Taiwan's shores. When Spain colonized Manila in the 16th century, Spanish Philippines managed to control northern Taiwan for a time, until the Dutch arrived and controlled Taiwan as a whole.

In 1662, Ming dynasty loyalist Koxinga who defeated the Dutch, controlled sections of Taiwan and later attempted to colonize the Philippines, but died before he could prepare an invasion. He also planned to conquer China, in favor of the Ming dynasty, but before the invasion, the Ming was defeated by the newly installed Qing dynasty.

During the rise of the Republic of China and against the Manchu Empire, a forefather of Taiwan, the first President of the Republic of China, Sun Yat-sen, had a deep friendship with the Filipino reformer and revolutionary, Mariano Ponce.

The Philippines officially recognized the Republic of China as the sole representative of China in the past. Formal diplomatic relations were ended with the establishment of formal relations between the Philippines and the People's Republic of China on June 9, 1975. During the time that the two countries had formal relations, the Philippines allowed the Republic of China to direct and manage all the Chinese schools in the country. When formal diplomatic relationship ended, the Philippines decided to take over in managing the Chinese schools. As of now, the People's Republic of China has no intervention of local Chinese schools, except for bilaterial partnerships.

However, the two countries established representative offices as de facto embassies, with Taiwan informally represented by the Pacific Economic and Cultural Center in Manila and the Philippines by the Asian Exchange Center in Taipei. In December 1989, the Pacific Economic and Cultural Center was renamed the Taipei Economic and Cultural Office in the Philippines and the Asian Exchange Center was renamed the Manila Economic and Cultural Office.

In August 2016, Taiwan's new government, headed by Tsai Ing-wen since May 2016, announced its New Southbound Policy shall focus on relations with the Philippines. Among the focal points for the Taiwan-Philippines cooperations are trade and investment, agriculture, fisheries, aquaculture, SMEs, ICT, climate change, education, and culture. The new policy was welcomed by the newly elected government in 2016, amidst the new government's policy to pivot towards mainland China.

In 2017, the Philippines and Taiwan inked an updated investment deal in Makati, the Philippines’ financial hub. The deal expanded to include the financial sector, infrastructure, and intellectual property of the two countries, far from a similar agreement in 1992 that only included the manufacturing sector. The two sides also signed six other deals as part of ministerial trade and economic consultations, including memoranda of understanding on “green” energy, insurance industry supervision, and professional training. The PRC government filed protests against the Philippines to stop the agreements, nonetheless, the agreements were signed on schedule. A poll in 2017 noted a huge increase in Filipino support towards Taiwanese independence from mainland China. The Philippines also supports the membership of Taiwan in UNESCO, in recognition of Taiwan's holistic conservation of heritage sites.

In January 2018, Taiwan provided aid to the Philippines to rehabilitate war-torn Marawi in Mindanao. Taiwan also sent its legislative speaker and numerous parliamentarians to the Philippines to further promote parliamentary exchanges and relations between the two nations. A recent survey found that a majority of the population of the Philippines supports Taiwanese independence.

Bilateral relation

The Philippines and Taiwan, traditionally, were not separate entities, but instead were linked through the jade trade route between the two areas. The current separation is of the two areas is widely viewed by scholars as an artifact of modern colonialism, Han settlement, and historical contingency.

The strong Taiwanese economy, particularly in the manufacturing industries, attracts cheap manual labor from the Philippines. Most Filipinos working in Taiwan work as factory workers, domestic workers, construction workers, fishermen and professionals, and they send a large part of their earnings to their families in the Philippines. Many Taiwanese men have also chosen Filipino women as brides through arranged marriages. An estimated 7,000 Filipino women now live there with their Taiwanese husbands. Filipino laborers in Taiwan are usually vulnerable to exploitation by their employers, a situation common to unskilled migrant workers all over the world. The Taiwanese government has been receptive to the cases involving mistreatment of Filipino workers in Taiwan. Filipino migrant caretakers in Taiwan have to go through a broker system that collects most of their monthly earnings, demands long work hours without overtime pay, and offers no days off. Some caretakers have to work for 24 hours a day. Home caretakers typically receive monthly salaries much lower than the standard set by the government because they are not covered by Taiwan's Labor Standards Act. Labor Rights for the Filipino workers have been recently improved in a very substantial manners by the Taiwanese government by pressuring their employers to offer increased wages. Nowadays, a high portion of Filipinos residing in Taiwan receive higher amount of wages in comparison with the local Taiwanese residents and the Taiwanese government has been providing excellent quality education to all Filipino children residing in the country.

Taiwan-Philippines bilateral trade volume reached US$12 billion in 2013. In 2013, Taiwan's export to the Philippines totaled US$9.78 billion while Taiwan's import from the Philippines reached a total of US$2.2 billion. In 2014, the Philippines was the 8th largest export and the 25th largest import partner to Taiwan, whereas Taiwan was the 9th largest export and 3rd largest import partner for the Philippines. Meanwhile, Taiwan was also the 7th largest foreign investor in the Philippines for Taiwan in 2014.

Taiwan was the 9th largest tourist source for the Philippines, whereas the Philippines was the 9th largest source of visitors for Taiwan in 2014.

In 2014, there were more than 100,000 Filipino workers and migrants in Taiwan. The annual remittance from Filipino workers in Taiwan amounted to more than US$100 million.

The air-links between Taipei/Kaohsiung and Manila are daily operated by China Airlines, Eva Air, Philippine Airlines, and Cebu Pacific Air.

The mutual interactions and exchanges in other areas like culture, education, agriculture and aquaculture are vibrant.

Filipinos enjoy a visa-waiver from entering Taiwan for tourism and business purposes up to 14 days. This took effect November 1, 2017 and due to expire July 31, 2018 but was extended until July 31, 2019. Prior to this, Filipinos need to secure a Travel Authorization Certificate or E-visa before traveling to Taiwan. Taiwanese visitors on the other hand need to secure an E-visa before traveling to the Philippines through MECO.

Economic relation

The total investment amount between the Philippines and Taiwan in 2016 reached up to US$147.7 billion. Taiwan was the 3rd largest foreign investor in the Philippines.

Philippine exports to Taiwan: US$2.06 billion
Philippine imports from Taiwan: US$5.06 billion

Others
As of December 2016, there were 136,400 overseas Filipino contract workers in the entire island as per official count of Taiwan's Workforce Development Agency (WDA) of the Ministry of Labor (MOL). Philippine holidays such as Independence day and José Rizal's birthday are also celebrated by the Filipino community in Taiwan. Taiwanese tourists in the Philippines for the period of January to December 2016 reached 231,801.

Disputes

Batanes and EEZ between the Philippines and Taiwan

On 23 December 2007, conflict began between the Philippines and Taiwan after Taiwan Times published an article written by Chen Hurng-yu, stating that Taiwan has claims on Batanes. The article claimed that the Philippines has allegedly "weak claim" over the country's northernmost province, while stating that the Philippines has control over it. The article also encouraged the Taiwanese government to take over the Philippine-controlled islands, which was first claimed by Spanish Philippines in 1783 and later incorporated and administered by the Philippines without any contesting nation in the 18th century.

On 9 May 2013, a Taiwanese boat refused to leave waters closer to the Philippines despite multiple Filipino diplomatic calls towards the Taiwanese side to leave. The stand-off later made the Philippine Coast Guard to open fire on the Taiwanese fishing boat, killing one fisherman. The Philippine government following the incident claimed that the shooting took place in their territorial waters. Following the incident, Taiwan imposed sanctions on the Philippines, including the freeze of Filipino hires. The Taiwanese Coast Guard later conducted rhythmic patrolling in the waters, triggering the Philippine Coast Guard to send patrols as well. On August 7, Filipino authorities recommended homicide charges against the coast guard personnel involved. On August 8, to normalize ties between the two sides, a Filipino envoy apologized to the victim's family, resulting to Taiwan's lifting of sanctions.

In 2015, another Taiwanese fishing vessel entered Filipino waters, triggering the Philippine coast guard vessel to pursue it. The incident ended when the Taiwanese fishing vessel was successfully chased away by the Philippine coast guard away from Filipino waters. A Taiwanese coast guard vessel arrived as well. Before the 2015 incident, the two sides were trying to formalize a fishing pact to resolve fishing disputes, including a commitment not to use force, and procedures on the detention and release of any fishing vessels or fishermen. In May 2019, the Philippines constructed Filipino fishermen shelters on Mavulis Island, the northernmost island of the Philippines, to aid Filipino fishermen stranded during storms and to safeguard the area from poachers and illegal fishermen coming from foreign lands. Majority of poachers in the area come from Taiwan and China. In September 2019, the officers involved in the 2013 incident between the two sides were convicted by court, ending the 7-year row.

Spratly Islands, Scarborough Shoal, and United Nations Tribunal ruling

The Philippines claims Scarborough Shoal and portions of the Spratly Islands through the 1734 internationally published Velarde map recognized by a United Nations Tribunal, while Taiwan claims the entire South China Sea via the internationally invalidated nine-dash line in a 1947 ROC-published map.

In January 2013, the Philippines formally initiated arbitration proceedings against China's claim on the territories within the "nine-dash line" that includes Spratly Islands, which it said is "unlawful" under the United Nations Convention on the Law of the Sea (UNCLOS). An arbitration tribunal was constituted under Annex VII of UNCLOS and it was decided in July 2013 that the Permanent Court of Arbitration (PCA) would function as registry and provide administrative duties in the proceedings.

On 12 July 2016, the arbitrators of the tribunal of PCA  agreed unanimously with the Philippines. They concluded in the award that there was no evidence that China had historically exercised exclusive control over the waters or resources, hence there was "no legal basis for China to claim historic rights" over the nine-dash line. Accordingly, the PCA tribunal decision is ruled as final and non-appealable by either countries. The tribunal also criticized China's land reclamation projects and its construction of artificial islands in the Spratly Islands, saying that it had caused "severe harm to the coral reef environment". It also characterized Taiping Island and other features of the Spratly Islands as "rocks" under UNCLOS, and therefore are not entitled to a 200 nautical mile exclusive economic zone. China however rejected the ruling, calling it "ill-founded". Taiwan, which currently administers Taiping Island and bases its claims on the invalidated nine-dash line also rejected the ruling, while numerous countries supported the ruling & positively acknowledged it. Among the supporters of the ruling were Australia, Belgium, Bosnia and Herzegovina, Bulgaria, Canada, Croatia, Cyprus, Czech Republic, Denmark, Estonia, Finland, France, Germany, Greece, Hungary, India, Ireland, Italy, Japan, Latvia, Lithuania, Luxembourg, Malta, Myanmar, Netherlands, New Zealand, Norway, Poland, Portugal, Romania, Singapore, Slovakia, Slovenia, South Korea, Spain, Sweden, United Kingdom and United States, as well as claimants to the area such as Malaysia, Vietnam, and the Philippines.

Diplomats

ROC Representatives to the Philippines
 Gary Lin (2014-)
 Wu Hsin-hsing (2003-2008)

ROC Ambassadors to the Philippines
 Han Lih-wu (1964-1968)

References

 
Taiwan
Bilateral relations of Taiwan